In enzymology, a 5,10-methylenetetrahydromethanopterin reductase is an enzyme that catalyzes the chemical reaction

5-methyltetrahydromethanopterin + coenzyme F420  5,10-methylenetetrahydromethanopterin + reduced coenzyme F420

Thus, the two substrates of this enzyme are 5-methyltetrahydromethanopterin and coenzyme F420, whereas its two products are 5,10-methylenetetrahydromethanopterin and reduced coenzyme F420.

This enzyme belongs to the family of oxidoreductases, specifically those acting on the CH-NH group of donors with other acceptors. The systematic name of this enzyme class is 5-methyltetrahydromethanopterin:coenzyme-F420 oxidoreductase. Other names in common use include 5,10-methylenetetrahydromethanopterin cyclohydrolase, N5,N10-methylenetetrahydromethanopterin reductase, methylene-H4MPT reductase, coenzyme F420-dependent N5,N10-methenyltetrahydromethanopterin, reductase, and N5,N10-methylenetetrahydromethanopterin:coenzyme-F420 oxidoreductase. This enzyme participates in folate biosynthesis.

References

 
 
 
 
 

EC 1.5.98
Enzymes of known structure